Giorgi is an Italian surname. Notable people with the surname include:

 Alessandro Giorgi (born 1993), Italian motorcycle racer
 Alex Giorgi (born 1957), Italian alpine skier
 Camila Giorgi (born 1991), Italian tennis player
 Débora Giorgi, Argentine politician
 Edolo J. Giorgi (1921–1993), American politician
 Eleonora Giorgi (born 1953), Italian actress and film director
 Eleonora Giorgi (racewalker) (born 1989), Italian race walker
 Elsie Giorgi (died 1998), American physician
 Ennio de Giorgi (1928–1996), Italian mathematician
 Francesco Giorgi (1466–1540), Venetian Franciscan friar and author
 Frank Giorgi (born 1981), Australian kickboxer of Italian origin
 Giácomo Di Giorgi (born 1981), Venezuelan footballer
 Giovanni Giorgi (1871–1950), Italian electrical engineer
 Hugo Giorgi (born 1920), Argentine footballer

See also 
 Giorgi (name), a Georgian name
 Di Giorgi (surname)

Italian-language surnames